A speculator is one who engages in speculation.

It may also refer to:

Speculator (video game), released in 1985
Speculator, New York, United States

See also
Speculator Mine disaster, United States, 1917
Field goal (rugby), also known as a speculator
Speculatores, members of the Roman Army
Spéculateur, French ship launched in 1806